Helix asemnis is a species of gastropods belonging to the family Helicidae.

The species is found in Mediterranean.

References

Helicidae
Gastropods described in 1860